Ankou is a servant of death in Breton, Cornish, Welsh and Norman French folklore.

Ankou may also refer to any of the following:

People 
 Eli Ankou, an NFL player

Art 
 L'Ankou, the twenty-seventh album of the Spirou et Fantasio series of comics

Towns in China 
 Ankou, Huating, a town of Huating, Gansu
 Ankou, Liuhe, a town of Liuhe, Tonhua, Jilin

Townships in China 
 Ankou, Lishui, a township of Lishui, Zhejiang

Other 
 Ankou railway station in Changlai town, Lechang City, Guangdong